Gastón Ricardo Liendo (born 29 May 1974) is an Argentine football coach and former player who played as a midfielder. He is the current assistant manager of Brazilian club Fortaleza.

Playing career 
He started playing football at Newell's Old Boys. He made his Serie B debut with FBC Unione Venezia  in the 2003-04 season.

References

External links 

1974 births
Living people
Sportspeople from Rosario, Santa Fe
Argentine footballers
Association football midfielders
Serie A players
Serie B players
Newell's Old Boys footballers
Racing Club de Avellaneda footballers
Club Atlético Belgrano footballers
Argentinos Juniors footballers
Venezia F.C. players
Mantova 1911 players
Aldosivi footballers
Central Córdoba de Rosario footballers
Argentine expatriate footballers
Argentine expatriate sportspeople in Italy
Expatriate footballers in Italy